Gary Charles Peters Sr. (born December 1, 1958) is an American lawyer, politician, and former military officer serving as the junior United States senator from Michigan since 2015. He represented  from 2009 to 2013.

Before his election to Congress, Peters served in the United States Navy Reserve, spent 22 years as an investment advisor, and worked briefly in academia. He was elected to the Rochester Hills City Council in 1991 and represented the 14th district in the Michigan Senate from 1995 to 2002. He was the Democratic nominee for Michigan Attorney General in 2002, narrowly losing to Republican Mike Cox. He was then appointed commissioner of the Michigan Lottery by Governor Jennifer Granholm, serving from 2003 to 2008, when he resigned to successfully run for Congress.

In 2014, Peters was elected to the United States Senate seat being vacated by retiring Democratic incumbent Carl Levin. He was unopposed in the Democratic primary and defeated Republican Terri Lynn Land in the general election. He was the only non-incumbent Democrat to win a Senate election in 2014. Peters was reelected in 2020, defeating Republican challenger John E. James in a close race.

On January 28, 2021, Peters was selected as chair of the Democratic Senatorial Campaign Committee for the 2022 election cycle. He was later selected again for the 2024 cycle.

Early life and education
Gary Charles Peters was born December 1, 1958, in Pontiac, Michigan, where he grew up. He is the son of Madeleine A. (née Vignier) and Herbert Garrett Peters, a historian and statistician. His mother was a French war bride and his father was American.

Peters graduated from Rochester High School in 1976 and chose to attend Alma College, where he graduated magna cum laude in 1980 with a Bachelor of Arts degree in political science and was inducted into Omicron Delta Kappa and Phi Beta Kappa. He earned a Master of Business Administration from the University of Detroit in 1984. Peters also holds a Juris Doctor and a Master of Arts in political science from Wayne State University and a Master of Arts in philosophy from Michigan State University. He also earned a diploma from the College of Naval Command and Staff, U.S. Naval War College.

Military career
Peters joined the United States Navy Reserve in 1993 at age 34. He served more than ten years in units at Selfridge Air National Guard Base, including Naval Mobile Construction Battalion 26. During his Navy service, Peters earned the Seabee Combat Warfare Specialist designation and carried out assignments as an assistant supply officer.

Peters's reserve duty included time in the Persian Gulf supporting Operation Southern Watch; he served overseas again during increased military activity following the September 11 attacks. Peters attained the rank of Lieutenant Commander before leaving the Reserve in 2008; his awards include the Navy and Marine Corps Achievement Medal and the Military Outstanding Volunteer Service Medal. In 2018, he received a diploma from the College of Naval Command and Staff.

Business and academic career
Peters worked for 22 years as a financial advisor, serving as an assistant vice president at Merrill Lynch from 1980 until 1989, when he joined Paine Webber as a vice president.

From 2007 to 2008, Peters served as the third Griffin Endowed Chair in American Government at Central Michigan University. In that part-time position, he taught one class a semester, plus preparing additional student activities including two policy forums, and developing a journal of Michigan politics and policy, for $65,000 a year. Peters announced his candidacy to run for Congress two months after being hired. Some student and faculty members protested Peters's hiring, saying he could not be objective in the classroom while running for office and that the university job was subsidizing his campaign.

Peters also has taught finance at Wayne State and strategic management and business policy courses at Oakland University.

Peters was a senior policy and financial analyst for the Michigan Department of Treasury and served on arbitration panels for the New York Stock Exchange and the Financial Industry Regulatory Authority.

Michigan Senate
Peters served on the Rochester Hills City Council from 1991 to 1993.

Elections
After a failed attempt in 1990, Peters was elected to the Michigan Senate to represent the Oakland County-based 14th district in November 1994. He was reelected in 1998 and served until 2002, stepping down then due to the state's term limits. Peters was succeeded in the 14th district by Gilda Jacobs.

Tenure
The 14th district is one of the most diverse state Senate districtscontaining nearly every racial, ethnic, and religious group in Michigan. Located in southeastern Oakland County, it includes the cities of Pontiac, Bloomfield Hills, Southfield, and Oak Park.

Peters was chosen by his Democratic colleagues to chair his party's caucus. He was also a member of the Michigan Law Revision Commission and served on the Michigan Sentencing Commission. Both the Michigan State House of Representatives and the Senate passed a bill sponsored by Peters which banned any new wells under the state waters of the Great Lakes except in case of a state energy emergency. The bill passed into law without the signature of Governor John Engler.

Committee assignments
Peters served as the vice chairman of the Senate Finance, Education, Judiciary and Economic Development Committees. He was also a member of the Natural Resources and the Mental Health and Human Services Committee.

2002 statewide elections

In his final year as a member of the Michigan Senate, Peters was a candidate for governor and later for Attorney General. As the Democratic nominee for attorney general, he lost in November 2002 to Republican Mike Cox by about 5,200 votesless than a 0.17 percent margin. Peters decided not to contest the election results despite reported irregularities. Several mistakes were reportedly found during analysis, including a precinct in Dearborn which recorded Peters with 96 votes when he actually had 396. The race was the closest statewide contest in Michigan since the 1950 gubernatorial race.

Michigan Governor Jennifer Granholm appointed Peters as the Michigan Lottery commissioner on April 9, 2003.

U.S. House of Representatives

Elections

2008

On August 7, 2007, Peters ended months of speculation by formally announcing he would run against eight-term Republican congressman Joe Knollenberg in the 9th district, which included almost all of Oakland County. Peters resigned as state lottery commissioner to devote his full energy to the campaign.

Knollenberg was considered vulnerable due to an increasing Democratic trend in what was once a classic bastion of suburban conservatism. Knollenberg's opponents in 2002 and 2004 had performed significantly below the Democratic base in the district, but he was nearly defeated in 2006 by Nancy Skinner, a former radio talk-show host who spent virtually no moneythe closest a Republican had come to losing the district in almost half a century. This led the Democratic Congressional Campaign Committee to target Knollenberg for defeat.

In the 2002 state attorney general race, Peters performed at or above the Democratic base in 72 percent of the 9th district precincts. In his 1998 state Senate campaign, he performed at or above base in 99 percent of the precincts.

Peters won the November 4 election by 33,524 votes, taking 52 percent of the vote to Knollenberg's 43 percent. Barack Obama carried Oakland County by 15 points; roughly two-thirds of Oakland County was in the 9th. Peters was the fourth person and first Democrat to represent the district since its creation in 1933 (it had previously been the 17th district from 1933 to 1953, the 18th from 1953 to 1973, the 19th from 1973 to 1983, the 18th from 1983 to 1993, the 11th from 1993 to 2003, and became the 9th in 2003).

2010

In November 2010, Peters defeated challenges by Republican Andrew "Rocky" Raczkowski, Libertarian Adam Goodman, Independent Bob Gray, Independent Matthew Kuofie, and Green Douglas Campbell.

2012

Due to the state's population decline, as reflected by the 2010 Federal Census, Michigan lost one congressional district. As a result of the subsequent redistricting of house seats, much of Peters's 9th district, including his home in Bloomfield Hills, was merged with the 12th district, represented by fellow Democrat Sander Levin. The new district retained Peters's district number (the 9th) but geographically was more Levin's district.

In September 2011, Peters opted to run in the newly redrawn 14th district. The district had previously been the 13th district, represented by freshman Democrat Hansen Clarke. The redrawn district is based in Detroit, but contains a large chunk of Peters's old State Senate district and portions of his old congressional district. Indeed, Peters had represented most of the Oakland County portion of the district at one time or another. Due to Detroit's dwindling population, it was no longer possible to keep the district exclusively within Wayne County.

In the August 2012 Democratic primary, Peters defeated Clarke, who had opted to follow most of his constituents into the reconfigured 14th even though his home had been drawn into the reconfigured 13th (the old 14th), and Southfield Mayor Brenda Lawrence. The 14th was a heavily Democratic, 58 percent black-majority district, and Peters was overwhelmingly favored in November. As expected, he bested Republican John Hauler in the general election with 82 percent of the vote. He was the first white congressman to represent a significant portion of Detroit since 1993.

Tenure
Peters was sworn into his first term in January 2009. During his time in office, he voted for the Recovery Act, also known as the stimulus, the Patient Protection and Affordable Care Act, the American Clean Energy and Security Act, which would have established a national emissions trading plan, but was not passed by the full Congress, the Paycheck Fairness Act, also not passed into law, the Lilly Ledbetter Fair Pay Act, and the DREAM Act to provide conditional permanent residency to certain immigrants.

Peters worked with the Obama Administration to obtain debt forgiveness for Chrysler. House Financial Services Committee Chairman Barney Frank said Peters was the "single most effective person" in fighting against the forces that wanted to let Detroit go bankrupt. In Congress, Peters opposed a plan to provide disaster relief aid, the funds for which would have come from the Advanced Technology Vehicles Manufacturing (ATVM) loan program.

In July 2010, the Michigan Messenger wrote that Peters was "criticizing the leadership of his own party. Peters and three other Democratic legislators... this week formed the Spending Cuts and Deficit Reduction Working Group and proposed a series of bills to cut spending. Peters's bill makes cuts in the federal energy budget." "We have been growing increasingly frustrated with the lack of action and talking about specifics and putting those on the table," Peters said. "We've been frustrated with both Democratic leadership and Republicans."

Peters allied himself with the Occupy Wall Street movement, making an appearance at Occupy Detroit on November 6, 2011. Speaking to reporters, he said: "It's speculation on Wall Street that we're still paying the price for here, particularly in Detroit that almost brought the auto industry to a collapse because of what we saw on Wall Street. So we put in restrictions, or put in regulations necessary to reign that in, and right now in Washington I'm facing a Republican majority that wants to undo that."

In 2011, Peters was one of 118 house Democrats who signed a letter to the president urging him to support the United Nations Population Fund (UNFPA), a multinational organization that provides health services (including birth control) to women, children and families in more than 150 countries.

In 2014, Peters voiced opposition to a Michigan law which prohibits insurers from offering abortion coverage as a standard feature in health plans.

Peters was named senior whip for the Democratic caucus in 2013.

U.S. Senate

Elections

2014

In 2014, Peters ran for the Senate seat being vacated by retiring Senator Carl Levin. Peters was endorsed by Levin and Senator Debbie Stabenow, and his entrance largely cleared the field of potential Democratic challengers.

Peters's largest independent supporter was the Senate Majority PAC, which spent almost $3.2million for ads attacking Peters's opponent in the race. In July 2014, Senator Elizabeth Warren supported Peters at a campaign fundraising event.

While the campaign was considered competitive early on, various missteps by the campaign of his Republican Party opponent Terri Lynn Land and her reluctance to appear in public benefited the Peters campaign; he had consistent leads in polls late in the campaign.

2020

Peters faced Republican nominee John E. James in the November 2020 general election. James previously ran unsuccessfully for Senate in 2018 against fellow Senator Debbie Stabenow. Less than a month before the election, he became the first sitting U.S. senator ever to publicly reveal a personal family experience with abortion. Peters was reelected to a second term, though by a closer margin (1.7%) than expected.

Tenure 
Peters was participating in the certification of the 2021 United States Electoral College vote count on January 6, 2021, when Trump supporters stormed the United States Capitol. Along with other senators and staff, Peters was evacuated from the Senate floor when rioters breached the Capitol. He hid in a secure location, where he tweeted that the attacks were "dangerous, unacceptable and an attack on our democracyand must stop." Peters blamed Trump, calling him "a clear and present danger" and calling for his immediate removal from office through the Twenty-fifth Amendment to the United States Constitution or impeachment. Peters also called for investigations into the security and intelligence failure that resulted in the breaching of the Capitol and the five deaths. He led the investigation as chair of the Senate Homeland Security and Governmental Affairs Committee.

Committee assignments
Committee on Armed Services
Subcommittee on Airland
Subcommittee on Emerging Threats and Capabilities (Chairman)
Committee on Commerce, Science, and Transportation
Subcommittee on Aviation and Space
Subcommittee on Communications, Technology, Innovation, and the Internet
Subcommittee on Science, Oceans, Fisheries and Weather
Subcommittee on Transportation and Safety
Committee on Homeland Security and Governmental Affairs (Chairman)
Joint Economic Committee

Political positions

In the Bipartisan Index created by The Lugar Center and the McCourt School of Public Policy, Peters was ranked the 17th most bipartisan member of the U.S. Senate (and the 4th most bipartisan Democrat) during the 115th U.S. Congress. The American Conservative Union gave him a 7% lifetime conservative rating 2020. In March 2021, the nonpartisan Center for Effective Lawmaking ranked Peters the most effective senator in the 116th Congress (2019-2020), despite being in the minority party.

Abortion and women's rights
Peters supports abortion rights. In the late 1980s, his first wife had a wanted pregnancy that failed at four months, but her miscarriage did not proceed naturally, causing a health emergency. Their hospital did not perform abortions, but they were able to obtain an emergency abortion at another hospital in part because they were friends with the hospital's administrator. He has supported the Paycheck Fairness Act and in 2015 voted in favor of the Violence Against Women Act.

Foreign policy

Israel
In March 2017, Peters cosponsored the Israel Anti-Boycott Act (S. 720), which made it a federal crime for Americans to encourage or participate in boycotts against Israel and Israeli settlements in the occupied Palestinian territories if protesting actions by the Israeli government.

China
In November 2017, in response to efforts by China to purchase tech companies based in the US, Peters was one of nine senators to cosponsor a bill that would broaden the federal government's ability to prevent foreign purchases of U.S. firms through increasing the strength of the Committee on Foreign Investment in the United States (CFIUS). The CFIUS's scope would be expanded to allow it to review along with possibly decline smaller investments and add additional national security factors for CFIUS to consider, including whether information about Americans would be exposed as part of transactions or whether the deal would facilitate fraud.

Guns
Peters is a gun owner. In 2010, he had a D rating from the National Rifle Association; by 2020, Peters had an F rating.

In the wake of the 2016 Orlando nightclub shooting, Peters participated in the Chris Murphy gun control filibuster.

In January 2019, Peters was one of 40 senators to introduce the Background Check Expansion Act, a bill that would require background checks for the sale or transfer of all firearms. Exceptions to the bill's background check requirement included transfers between members of law enforcement, loaning firearms for hunting or sporting events on a temporary basis, providing them as gifts to members of one's immediate family, transferring them as part of an inheritance, or giving one to another person temporarily for immediate self-defense.

Health care
In 2009, Peters voted for the Affordable Care Act. He has opposed attempts to repeal the law, and supported a Medicare public option to expand health care access.

Immigration
On February 4, 2021, Peters voted against providing COVID-19 pandemic financial support to undocumented immigrants.

Personal life
Peters is married to Colleen Ochoa from Waterford Township, Michigan; they have three children. They reside in Bloomfield Township, Michigan.

According to financial disclosure documents, Peters had assets between $1.7million and $6.3million at the end of 2014. In 2014, Peters's net worth ranked 37th in the Senate.

Peters received the Distinguished Eagle Scout Award in 2019. Peters is a member of the Sons of the American Revolution. His ancestor William Garrett served in the Virginia Militia in the Revolutionary War alongside General Washington at Valley Forge during the harsh winter of 1777–1778.

Peters is an avid motorcyclist and has made a tradition of annual motorcycle tours of Michigan.

Peters is an Episcopalian. He has said his spirituality is important to him and "gives me comfort in rough times".

Electoral history

References

External links

U.S. Senator Gary Peters official U.S. Senate website
Gary Peters for U.S. Senate

Campaign finances at OpenSecrets

|-

|-

|-

|-

|-

|-

1958 births
Living people
20th-century American naval officers
21st-century American politicians
21st-century American naval officers
Alma College alumni
American people of French descent
Central Michigan University faculty
Democratic Party members of the United States House of Representatives from Michigan
Democratic Party United States senators from Michigan
Michigan lawyers
Military personnel from Michigan
Democratic Party Michigan state senators
Oakland University faculty
People from Bloomfield Hills, Michigan
Sons of the American Revolution
United States Navy reservists
University of Detroit Mercy alumni
Wayne State University alumni
Wayne State University faculty
American Episcopalians